Tourism in Bahrain: Bahrain receives four million tourists a year. Most visitors are from Arab states of the Persian Gulf but there are an increasing number of tourists from outside the region.

Islands
 Al Dar Island
 Hawar Islands: a group of islands off the west coast of Qatar in the Gulf of Bahrain
 Durrat Al Bahrain: a land-reclamation development similar to Dubai's Palm Islands.
Bahrain BayBahrain Bay is a waterfront real estate development situated on the north-east coastline of the Kingdom of Bahrain.

Malls

Bahrain City Centre, in Manama.
Dana Mall
Al Enma Mall
The Avenues

Museums
The Bahrain National Museum has a collection of artifacts from the Kingdom's history dating back to the island's first human inhabitation 5000 years ago.

Beit Al Qur'an, one of the island's most distinctive pieces of architecture, is home to a rare collection of Islamic manuscripts, prints and books. It is located in Hoora, part of the capital, Manama.

The Oil Museum is located near Jabal Ad Dukhan. It was built in 1992 to commemorate the 60th anniversary of the first discovery of oil in the Persian Gulf, it exhibits old photographs, drilling equipment and a working model of an oil rig.

Other places to visit in Bahrain

Qal'at al-Bahrain
Al Fateh Grand Mosque
Al Areen Wildlife Park
Tree of Life
Jasra
Bahrain International Circuit

See also
 Visa policy of Bahrain
 Bahrain Grand Prix
 Bahrain International Airshow
 Tree Of Life
 List of tourist attractions in Bahrain
 History of Bahrain
 Hamad Bin Isa Al Khalifa

References

External links

 
Bahrain